

Supermarkets

Former:
 Carrefour

Bio / Eco stores

Specialty store chains

Clothing

Home improvement and furniture

Sport equipment

Footwear

Consumer electronics

Pharmacies

Drugstores

Chocolate

Books and media

Jewelry, goldsmith & watch stores

Petrol stations

Fast food chains

Former:
 Mekicite od Straza

References

Macedonia

Supermarkets